Man's Enemy is a 1914 American short drama film directed by  Frank Powell and starring Lillian Gish. Prints of the film survive in the film archives of the Library of Congress and the Museum of Modern Art.

Cast
 Lillian Gish
 Franklin Ritchie
 Vivian Prescott
 Henry B. Walthall
 Dorothy Gish

See also
 Lillian Gish filmography

References

External links

1914 films
1914 short films
American silent short films
1914 drama films
American black-and-white films
Films directed by Frank Powell
Silent American drama films
Films with screenplays by Frank E. Woods
1910s American films
1910s English-language films
English-language drama films
American drama short films